Irina Palm is a 2007 tragicomedy film directed by Sam Garbarski and starring Marianne Faithfull and Miki Manojlović. It is a co-production of five countries (Belgium, Luxembourg, Great Britain, Germany and France). The film premiered at the 2007 Berlin International Film Festival. The film has earned over US $10 million worldwide.

Plot 
The 60-year-old widow Maggie (Marianne Faithfull) desperately needs money for the cost of traveling to Australia for a special medical treatment of her beloved ill grandson Olly. After several unsuccessful attempts to get a job, she finds herself in the streets of Soho. Her eye is caught by poster in the window of a shop called Sexy World: "Hostess wanted." She enters, and Miki (Miki Manojlović), the owner of the shop, explains to her frankly that "hostess" is a euphemism for "whore." The job he has for her is one for which age and being visually attractive are not important: a male customer inserts his penis in a hole in a wall (glory hole), and she, at the other side, gives a handjob (however, the film does not show any penis). Her colleague, Luisa, shows her how to do it, and after the first hesitation, she quickly develops good skills. However, she keeps her work secret from friends and family, which leads to uncomfortable situations.  After a while, she tells some friends. They are quite interested and ask various details.

Under the pseudonym Irina Palm, she becomes increasingly more successful and well-paid, 600 to 800 pounds a week. However, the health of her grandson deteriorates quickly, therefore she asks and receives an advance payment of 6000 pounds for 10 weeks of work. She gives the money to her son Tom (Kevin Bishop) without telling how she got it. He follows her to learn about the source of the money, and is furious when he discovers what she does. He wants her to never go there again and says he will himself return the money and not go to Australia. However, his wife, Sarah, is thankful to Maggie for her sacrifice to save the boy. Tom and Maggie reconcile and Tom, Sarah, and Olly go to Australia.

Luisa is fired due to Maggie's success. She is very angry at Maggie. A competitor of Miki's offers Maggie a better job, as supervisor of prostitutes in a room with multiple glory holes. She would get 15% of their earnings. She hesitates but eventually declines the offer; becoming a "madam" is a step too far for her. Maggie and Miki eventually fall in love with each other.

Cast 

 Marianne Faithfull as Maggie, the film's protagonist, who starts working in a sex shop to pay for her grandson's medical treatment
 Miki Manojlović as Miklos, owner of the sex shop
 Kevin Bishop as Tom, Maggie's son
 Siobhan Hewlett as Sarah, Tom's wife and Maggie's daughter-in-law
 Corey Burke as Olly, Tom and Sarah's son and Maggie's grandson
 Dorka Gryllus as Luisa, one of Maggie's colleagues in the sex shop
 Jenny Agutter as Jane, one of Maggie's friends
 Meg Wynn Owen as Julia, one of Maggie's friends
 Susan Hitch as Beth, one of Maggie's friends
 Flip Webster as Edith, the local shopkeeper

Awards 
 Nominated for the Golden Bear for Best Movie at the 2007 Berlin International Film Festival
 Miki Manojlovic is nominated for Best European Actor of 2007 by European Film Academy for his role in Irina Palm
 Marianne Faithfull received a Best Actress nomination for her role in the European Film Awards, but Helen Mirren won in that category for The Queen.

References

External links 
 
 

2007 films
2007 comedy-drama films
British black comedy films
Tragicomedy films
British comedy-drama films
2007 black comedy films
2000s English-language films
2000s British films